Saare Jahan Se Acha is a web reality series highlighting the good works of ordinary people to improve society. It is directed by Prakash Bhardwaj, and presented by filmmaker Prakash Jha. The series premiered on Republic Day of India on 26 January 2018.

Episodes

References

External links
 

2018 Indian television series debuts
Indian drama television series
Law enforcement in fiction
True crime television series
Police procedural television series